Nexus is a progressive rock band from Argentina. The band was founded in the late 1970s, but released its first album in 1999.

The band is well known around the world. It has performed in different countries (Argentina, Brazil, Mexico, United States, Chile, Panama) and has experienced good sales, reception and reviews of its albums.

Discography 
 1999: Detrás del Umbral (Record Runner, Studio album)
 2001: Metanoia (Record Runner, Studio album)
 2002: Live at NEARFest 2000 (Record Runner, Live)
 2006: Perpetuum Karma (Record Runner, Studio album)
 2007: Bs As Free Experience 2 (Record Runner, Studio jamming album)
 2012: Magna Fabulis
 2012: Aire (Record Runner, Studio album)
 2017: En el Comienzo del Topos Uranos (Record Runner, Studio album, cd and vinyl version)

Musicians 
 1999: Detrás del Umbral
 2001: Metanoia
 2002: Live at NEARFest 2000
Mariela González: lead vocals.
Carlos Lucena: guitars.
Daniel Ianniruberto: bass.
Luis Nakamura: drums.
Lalo Huber: keyboards.

 2006: Perpetuum Karma
Lito Marcello: lead vocals.
Carlos Lucena: guitars.
Daniel Ianniruberto: bass.
Luis Nakamura: drums, percussion.
Lalo Huber: keyboards.

 2007: Bs As Free Experience 2
Carlos Lucena: guitars.
Daniel Ianniruberto: bass.
Luis Nakamura: drums, percussion.
Lalo Huber: keyboards.
	guest:
Lito Marcello: lead vocal.
Ricardo Soulé: violin.

 2012: Magna Fabulis
Carlos Lucena: guitars; bass.
Luis Nakamura: drums.
Lalo Huber: keyboards.
	guest:
Daniel Ianniruberto: bass.
Lito Marcello: lead vocal.

 2012: Aire
Carlos Lucena: guitars, backing vocals.
Machy Madero: bass.
Luis Nakamura: drums.
Lalo Huber: keyboards and lead vocals.
	guest:
Roxana Trúccolo: lead vocals.

 2017: En el Comienzo del Topos Uranos
Carlos Lucena: guitars.
Jorge Mariño Martínez: bass.
Luis Nakamura: drums.
Lalo Huber: keyboards.
	invitada:
Roxana Trúccolo: lead vocals.

External links 
  Spanish site
 Band review
 Another band review
 Band review with discography (German)

Argentine progressive rock groups